El Bayadh Airport (  is a public airport serving El Bayadh, the capital in El Bayadh Province. It is located about 10 km northwest of the city. It is operated by Etablissement de Gestion des Services Aéroportuaires d’Oran.

Infrastructure

Runway 
The airport has one runway marked 04/22, 3000 m long and 45 m wide with asphalt-concrete surface.

Terminal 
The airport has just one terminal.

Airlines and destinations

Ground transportation 
By taxi.

References

Airports in Algeria
Buildings and structures in El Bayadh Province